Thiago França is a Portuguese footballer who played for 3 de Febrero in the Primera División Paraguaya.

The player joined 3 de Febrero in June 2011, and made his only appearance for the club in a 1–0 home loss against Olimpia Asunción on 23 October 2011.

References

External links

Living people
Portuguese footballers
Association footballers not categorized by position
Year of birth missing (living people)